The 1971 German Formula Three Championship was a multi-event motor racing championship for single-seat open wheel formula racing cars held across Europe. The championship featured drivers competing in two-litre Formula Three racing cars which conformed to the technical regulations, or formula, for the championship. It commenced on 11 April at Nürburgring and ended at Mendig on 29 August after six rounds.

Manfred Mohr became a champion. He won the season opener. Dieter Kern finished as runner-up, winning race at Bremgarten. Hermann Unold completed the top-three in the drivers' standings.

Calendar
All rounds were held in West Germany.

Championship standings
Points are awarded as follows:

References

External links
 

German Formula Three Championship seasons
Formula Three season